Pterolophia gigas is a species of beetle in the family Cerambycidae. It was described by Maurice Pic in 1937.

References

gigas
Beetles described in 1937